The flag of the city of Warsaw, the capital of Poland, is a bicolour rectangle, divided into two equally-sized horizontal stripes: yellow at the top, and red at the bottom. It begun being used in 1938 without official status, and was officially adopted by the city, in 1991.

Design 

The flag of the city of Warsaw, the capital of Poland, is a bicolour rectangle, divided into two horizontal stripes of equal width, yellow at the top, and red at the bottom. The flag doesn't have specified proportions, though popularly used proportions include 2:3 and 5:8.

Its colours had been adopted from the coat of arms of the city, which depicts a mermaid with golden (yellow) sword, shield and hair, on the red background, and with a golden (yellow) crown above the escutcheon.

History 
The yellow and red flag begun being used as the symbol of Warsaw in 1938, though without any official status. The flag was officially adopted as the city symbol in 1991.

See also
 Coat of arms of Warsaw
 List of flags of the quarters of Warsaw

References

External links

Flag
Flag
Flag
Flags of cities in Poland
Flags introduced in 1938
Flags introduced in 1991
1938 establishments in Poland
1991 establishments in Poland